Ernst Ising (May 10, 1900 in Cologne, Germany – May 11, 1998 in Peoria, Illinois, USA) was a German physicist, who is best remembered for the development of the Ising model. He was a professor of physics at Bradley University until his retirement in 1976.

Life 
Ernst Ising was born in Cologne in 1900. Ernst Ising's parents were the merchant Gustav Ising and his wife Thekla Löwe. After school, he studied physics and mathematics at the University of Göttingen and University of Hamburg. In 1922, he began researching ferromagnetism under the guidance of Wilhelm Lenz. He earned a Ph.D in physics from the University of Hamburg in 1924 when he published his doctoral thesis (an excerpt or a summary of his doctoral thesis was published as an article in a scientific journal in 1925 and this has led many to believe that he published his full thesis in 1925, see,). His doctoral thesis studied a problem suggested by his teacher, Wilhelm Lenz. He investigated the special case of a linear chain of magnetic moments, which are only able to take two positions, "up" and "down," and which are coupled by interactions between nearest neighbors. Mainly through following studies by Rudolf Peierls, Hendrik Kramers, Gregory Wannier and Lars Onsager the model proved to be successful explaining phase transitions between ferromagnetic and paramagnetic states.

After earning his doctorate, Ernst Ising worked for a short time in business before becoming a teacher, in Salem, Strausberg and Crossen, among other places. In 1930, he married the economist Dr. Johanna Ehmer (February 2, 1902 – February 2, 2012; later known as Jane Ising and just barely becoming a supercentenarian). As a young German–Jewish scientist, Ising was barred from teaching and researching when Hitler came to power in 1933. In 1934, he found a position, first as a teacher and then as headmaster, at a Jewish school in Caputh near Potsdam for Jewish students who had been thrown out of public schools. Ernst and his wife Dr. Johanna Ising, née Ehmer, lived in Caputh near the famous summer residence of the Einstein family. In 1938, the school in Caputh was destroyed by the Nazis, and in 1939 the Isings fled to Luxembourg, where Ising earned money as a shepherd and railroad worker. After the German Wehrmacht occupied Luxembourg, Ernst Ising was forced to work for the army. In 1947, the Ising family emigrated to the United States. Though he became Professor of Physics at Bradley University in Peoria, Illinois, he never published again. Ising died at his home in Peoria in 1998, just one day after his 98th birthday.

Work

The Ising model is defined on a discrete collection of variables called spins, which can take on the value 1 or −1. The spins  interact in pairs, with energy that has one value when the two spins are the same, and a second value when the two spins are different.

The energy of the Ising model is defined to be:

where the sum counts each pair of spins only once. Notice that the product of spins is either +1 if the two spins are the same (aligned), or −1 if they are different (anti-aligned). J is half the difference in energy between the two possibilities. Magnetic interactions seek to align spins relative to one another.  Spins become randomized when thermal energy is greater than the strength of the interaction.

For each pair, if
 the interaction is called ferromagnetic
 the interaction is called antiferromagnetic
 the spins are noninteracting

A ferromagnetic interaction tends to align spins, and an antiferromagnetic tends to antialign them.

The spins can be thought of as living on a graph, where each node has exactly one spin, and each edge connects two spins with a nonzero value of J. If all the Js are equal, it is convenient to measure energy in units of J. Then a model is completely specified by the graph and the sign of J.

The antiferromagnetic one-dimensional Ising model has the energy function:

where i runs over all the integers. This links each pair of nearest neighbors.

In his 1924 PhD thesis, Ising solved the model for the 1D case.  In one dimension, the solution admits no phase transition.  On the basis of this result, he incorrectly concluded that his model does not exhibit phase transition in any dimension.

It was only in 1949 that Ising knew the importance his model attained in scientific literature, 25 years after his Ph.D thesis. Today, each year, about 800 papers are published that use the model to address problems in such diverse fields as neural networks, protein folding, biological membranes and social behavior.

See also
Lattice density functional theory (1925) solution to the one-dimensional (1D) lattice problem

Notes

External links 
 The Fate of Ernst Ising and the Fate of his Model
 Ernst Ising's 1924 PhD thesis (English translation)
 Article from Bradley University about Ising
 

1900 births
1998 deaths
20th-century German physicists
Jewish physicists
Jewish emigrants from Nazi Germany
German emigrants to the United States
University of Göttingen alumni
University of Hamburg alumni
 
Bradley University faculty
Scientists from Cologne
People from Peoria, Illinois